The term periodical cicada is commonly used to refer to any of the seven species of the genus Magicicada of eastern North America, the 13- and 17-year cicadas. They are called periodical because nearly all individuals in a local population are developmentally synchronized and emerge in the same year. Although they are sometimes called "locusts", this is a misnomer, as cicadas belong to the taxonomic order Hemiptera (true bugs), suborder Auchenorrhyncha, while locusts are grasshoppers belonging to the order Orthoptera. Magicicada belongs to the cicada tribe Lamotialnini, a group of genera with representatives in Australia, Africa, and Asia, as well as the Americas.

Magicicada species spend around 99.5% of their long lives underground in an immature state called a nymph. While underground the nymphs feed on xylem fluids from the roots of deciduous forest trees in the eastern United States. In the spring of their 13th or 17th year mature cicada nymphs emerge between late April and early June at a given locality, synchronously and in tremendous numbers. The adults are active for only about four to six weeks after the unusually prolonged developmental phase.

The males aggregate in chorus centers and call there to attract mates. Mated females lay eggs in the stems of woody plants. Within two months of the original emergence, the life cycle is complete and the adult cicadas die. Later in that same summer the eggs hatch and the new nymphs burrow underground to develop for the next 13 or 17 years.

Periodical emergences are also reported for the "World Cup cicada" Chremistica ribhoi (every four years) in northeast India and for a cicada species from Fiji, Raiateana knowlesi (every eight years).

Description

The winged imago (adult) periodical cicada has red eyes and a black dorsal thorax. The wings are translucent with orange veins. The underside of the abdomen may be black, orange, or striped with orange and black, depending on the species.

Adults are typically , depending on species, generally about 75% the size of most of the annual cicada species found in the same region. Mature females are slightly larger than males.

Magicicada males typically form large aggregations that sing in chorus to attract receptive females. Different species have different characteristic calling songs. The call of decim periodical cicadas is said to resemble someone calling "weeeee-whoa" or "Pharaoh". The cassini and decula periodical cicadas (including M. tredecula) have songs that intersperse buzzing and ticking sounds.

Cicadas cannot sting and do not normally bite. Like other Auchenorrhyncha (true) bugs, they have mouthparts used to pierce plants and suck their sap. These mouthparts are used during the nymph stage to tap underground roots for water, minerals and carbohydrates and in the adult stage to acquire nutrients and water from plant stems. An adult cicada's proboscis can pierce human skin when it is handled, which is painful, but in no other way harmful. Cicadas are neither venomous nor poisonous and there is no evidence that they or their bites can transmit diseases.

Cicadas pose little threat to mature vegetation, although planting new trees or shrubs is best postponed until after an expected emergence of the periodical cicadas. Mature plants rarely suffer lasting damage, although twig die-off or flagging may result from egg-laying.

Massospora cicadina is a fungal pathogen that infects only 13 and 17 year periodical cicadas. Infection results in a "plug" of spores that replaces the end of the cicada's abdomen while it is still alive, leading to infertility, disease transmission, and eventual death of the cicada.

Life cycle

Nearly all cicadas spend years underground as juveniles, before emerging above ground for a short adult stage of several weeks to a few months. The seven periodical cicada species are so named because, in any one location, all members of the population are developmentally synchronized—they emerge as adults all at once in the same year. This periodicity is especially remarkable because their life cycles are so long—13 or 17 years. No other species of cicada in the world (among perhaps 3,000 species) synchronize their development in this way.

In contrast, for nonperiodical species, some adults mature each summer and emerge while the rest of the population continues to develop underground. Many people refer to these nonperiodical species as annual cicadas because some are seen every summer. This may lead some to conclude that the non-periodic cicadas have life cycles of one year. This is incorrect. The few known life cycles of "annual" species range from two to 10 years, although some could be longer.

The nymphs of the periodical cicadas live underground, usually within  of the surface, feeding on the juices of plant roots. The nymphs of the periodical cicada undergo five instar stages in their development underground. The difference in the 13- and 17-year life cycle is said to be the time needed for the second instar to mature. When underground the nymphs move deeper below ground, detecting and then feeding on larger roots as they mature.

In late April to early June of the emergence year, mature fifth-instar nymphs construct tunnels to the surface and wait for the soil temperature to reach a critical value. In some situations, nymphs extend mud turrets up to several inches above the soil surface. The function of these turrets is not known, but the phenomenon has been observed in some nonperiodical cicadas, as well as other tunneling insects.

The crepuscular emergence is thought to be related to the fact that maximum soil temperatures lag behind maximum insolation by several hours, conveniently providing some protection for the flightless nymphs against diurnal sight predators such as birds. For the rest of their lives the mature periodical cicadas will be strongly diurnal, with song often nearly ceasing at night. 

During most years in the United States this emergence cue translates to late April or early May in the far south, and late May to early June in the far north. Emerging nymphs may molt in the grass or climb from a few centimeters to more than 100 feet (30 m) to find a suitable vertical surface to complete their transformation into adults. After securing themselves to tree trunks, the walls of buildings, telephone poles, fenceposts, hanging foliage, and even stationary automobile tires, the nymphs undergo a final molt and then spend about six days in the trees to await the complete hardening of their wings and exoskeletons. Just after emerging from this final molt the teneral adults are off-white, but darken within an hour.

Adult periodical cicadas live for only a few weeks; by mid-July, all have died. Their ephemeral adult forms are adapted for one purpose: reproduction. Like other cicadas the males produce a very loud species-specific mating song using their tymbals. Singing males of the same Magicicada species tend to form aggregations called choruses whose collective songs are attractive to females. Males in these choruses alternate bouts of singing with short flights from tree to tree in search of receptive females. Most matings occur in so-called chorus trees.

Receptive females respond to the calls of conspecific males with timed wing-flicks (visual signaling is apparently a necessity in the midst of the males' song) which attract the males for mating. The sound of a chorus can be literally deafening and depending on the number of males composing it, may reach 100 dB in the immediate vicinity. In addition to their "calling" or "congregating" songs, males produce a distinctive courtship song when approaching an individual female.

Both males and females can mate multiple times, although most females seem to mate only once. After mating, the female cuts V-shaped slits in the bark of young twigs and lays about 20 eggs in each, for a total clutch of 600 or more. After about 6–10 weeks, the eggs hatch and the nymphs drop to the ground, where they burrow and begin another 13- or 17-year cycle.

Predator satiation survival strategy

The nymphs emerge in very large numbers at nearly the same time, sometimes more than 1.5 million individuals per acre (>370/m2). Their mass emergence is, among other things, a survival trait called predator satiation. The details of this strategy are simple: for the first week after emergence the periodical cicadas are easy prey for reptiles, birds, squirrels, cats, dogs and other small and large mammals. In their present range the periodical cicadas have no effective predators, and all other animals feeding on them after emergence quickly fade into irrelevance with respect to their impact on total cicada populations.  

Early entomologists maintained that the cicadas' overall survival mechanism was simply to overwhelm predators by their sheer numbers, ensuring the survival of most of the individuals. Later, the fact that the developmental periods were both a prime number of years (13 and 17) was hypothesized to be a predator avoidance strategy, one adopted to eliminate the possibility of potential predators receiving periodic population boosts by synchronizing their own generations to divisors of the cicada emergence period.

On this prime number hypothesis, a predator with a three-year reproductive cycle, which happened to coincide with a brood emergence in a given year, will have gone through either four cycles plus one year (12 + 1) or five cycles plus two years (15 + 2) by the next time that brood emerges. In this way prime-numbered broods exhibit a strategy to ensure that they nearly always emerge when some portion of the predators they will confront are sexually immature and therefore incapable of taking maximum advantage of the momentarily limitless food supply.

Another viewpoint turns this hypothesis back onto the cicada broods themselves. It posits that the prime-numbered developmental times represent an adaptation to prevent hybridization between broods. It is hypothesized that this unusual method of sequestering different populations in time arose when conditions were extremely harsh. Under those conditions the mutation producing extremely long development times became so valuable that cicadas which possessed it found it beneficial to protect themselves from mating with cicadas that lacked the long-development trait. 

In this way, the long-developing cicadas retained a trait allowing them to survive the period of heavy selection pressure (i.e., harsh conditions) brought on by isolated and lowered populations during the period immediately following the retreat of glaciers (in the case of periodical cicadas, the North American Pleistocene glacial stadia). When seen in this light, their mass emergence and the predator satiation strategy that follows from this serves only to maintain the much longer-term survival strategy of protecting their long-development trait from hybridizations that might dilute it.

This hybridization hypothesis was subsequently supported through a series of mathematical models and remains the most widely-accepted explanation for the unusually lengthy and mathematically sophisticated survival strategy of these insects. The length of the cycle was hypothesized to be controlled by a single gene locus, with the 13-year cycle dominant to the 17-year one, but this interpretation remains controversial and unsubstantiated at the level of DNA.

Impact on other populations
Cycles in cicada populations are significant enough to affect other animal and plant populations. For example, tree growth has been observed to decline the year before the emergence of a brood because of the increased feeding on roots by the growing nymphs. Moles, which feed on nymphs, have been observed to do well during the year before an emergence, but suffer population declines the following year because of the reduced food source. Wild turkey populations respond favorably to increased nutrition in their food supply from gorging on cicada adults on the ground at the end of their life cycles. Uneaten carcasses of periodical cicadas decompose on the ground, providing a resource pulse of nutrients to the forest community.

Cicada broods may also have a negative impact. Eastern gray squirrel populations have been negatively affected, because the egg-laying activity of female cicadas damaged upcoming mast crops.

Broods
Periodical cicadas are grouped into geographic broods based on the calendar year when they emerge. For example, in 2014, the 13-year brood XXII emerged in Louisiana and the 17-year brood III emerged in western Illinois and eastern Iowa. 

In 1907, entomologist Charles Lester Marlatt assigned Roman numerals to 30 different broods of periodical cicadas: 17 distinct broods with a 17-year life cycle, to which he assigned brood numbers I through XVII (with emerging years 1893 through 1909); plus 13 broods with a 13-year cycle, to which he assigned brood numbers XVIII through XXX (1893 through 1905). Marlatt noted that the 17-year broods are generally more northerly than are the 13-year broods.

Many of these hypothetical 30 broods have not been observed. Marlatt noted that some cicada populations (especially Brood XI in the valley of the Connecticut River in Massachusetts and Connecticut) were disappearing, a fact that he attributed to the reduction in forests and the introduction and proliferation of insect-eating "English sparrows"  (House sparrows, Passer domesticus) that had followed the European settlement of North America. Two of the broods that Marlatt named (Broods XI and XXI) are now extinct. His numbering scheme has been retained for convenience (and because it clearly separates 13- and 17-year life cycles), although only 15 broods are known to survive today.

Map of brood locations

Taxonomy

Phylogeny 
Magicicada is a member of the cicada tribe Lamotialnini, which is distributed globally aside from South America. Despite Magicicada being only found in eastern North America, its closest relatives are thought to be the genera Tryella and Aleeta from Australia, with Magicicada being sister to the clade containing Tryella and Aleeta. Within the Americas, its closest relative is thought to be the genus Chrysolasia from Guatemala.

Species 
Seven recognized species are placed within Magicicada—three 17-year species and four 13-year species. These seven species are also sometimes grouped differently into three subgroups, the so-called Decim species group, Cassini species group, and Decula species group, reflecting strong similarities of each 17-year species with one or more species with a 13-year cycle.

Evolution and speciation

Not only are the periodical cicada life cycles curious for their use of the prime numbers 13 or 17, but their evolution is also intricately tied to one- and four-year changes in their life cycles. One-year changes are less common than four-year changes and are probably tied to variation in local climatic conditions. Four-year early and late emergences are common and involve a much larger proportion of the population than one-year changes. The different species are well-understood to have originated from a process of allochronic speciation, in which species subpopulations that are isolated from one another in time eventually become reproductively isolated as well.

Recent research suggests that in extant periodical cicadas, the 13- and 17-year life cycles evolved at least eight different times in the last 4 million years and that different species with identical life cycles developed their overlapping geographic distribution by synchronizing their life cycles to the existing dominant populations. The same study estimates that the Decim species group split from the common ancestor of the Decula plus Cassini species groups around 4 million years ago (Mya). At around 2.5 Mya, the Cassini and Decula groups split from each other.

The Sota et al. (2013) paper also calculates that the first separation of extant 13-year cicadas from 17-year cicadas took place in the Decim group about 530,000 years ago when the southern M. tredecim split from the northern M. septendecim. The second noteworthy event took place about 320,000 years ago with the split of the western Cassini group from its conspecifics to the east. The Decim and the Decula clades experienced similar western splits, but these are estimated to have taken place 270,000 and 230,000 years ago, respectively. The 13- and 17-year splits in Cassini and Decula took place after these events.

The 17-year cicadas largely occupy formerly glaciated territory, and as a result their phylogeographic relationships reflect the effects of repeated contraction into glacial refugia (small islands of suitable habitat) and subsequent re-expansion during multiple interglacial periods. In each species group, Decim, Cassini, and Decula, the signature of the glacial periods is manifested today in three phylogeographic genetic subdivisions: one subgroup east of the Appalachians, one midwestern, and one on the far western edge of their range.

The Sota et al. data suggest that the founders of the southern 13-year cicada populations seen today originated from the Decim group. These were later joined by Cassini originating from the western Cassini clade and Decula originating from eastern, middle, and western Decula clades. As Cassini and Decula invaded the south, they became synchronized with the resident M. tredecim. Today, these Cassini and Decula are known as M. tredecassini and M. tredecula. More data is needed to lend support to this hypothesis and others hypotheses related to more recent 13- and 17-year splits involving M. neotredecim and M. tredecim.

Distribution
The 17-year periodical cicadas are distributed across the Eastern, upper Midwestern, and Great Plains states within the U.S., while the 13-year cicadas occur in the Southern and Mississippi Valley states, but some may overlap slightly. For example, broods IV (17-year cycle) and XIX (13-year cycle) overlap in western Missouri and eastern Oklahoma. Their emergences should again coincide in 2219, 2440, 2661, etc., as they did in 1998 (although distributions change slightly from generation to generation and older distribution maps can be unreliable.).

An effort that the National Geographic Society is sponsoring is currently underway (as of April 2021) at the University of Connecticut to generate new distribution maps of all periodical cicada broods. The effort uses crowdsourced data and records that entomologists and volunteers collect.

Symbiosis

Magicicada are unable to obtain all of the essential amino acids from the dilute xylem fluid that they feed upon, and instead rely upon endosymbiotic bacteria that provide essential vitamins and nutrients for growth. Bacteria in the genus Hodgkinia live inside periodical cicadas, and grow and divide for years before punctuated cicada reproduction events impose natural selection on these bacteria to maintain a mutually beneficial relationship. As a result, the genome of Hodgkinia has fractionated into three independent bacterial species each containing only a subset of genes essential for this symbiosis. The host now requires all three subgroups of symbionts, as only the complete complement of all three subgroups provides the host with all its essential nutrients. The Hodgkinia–Magicicada symbiosis is a powerful example of how bacterial endosymbionts drive the evolution of their hosts.

History
The first known account of a large emergence of cicadas appeared in a 1633 report by William Bradford, the governor of the Plymouth Colony, which had been established in 1620 within the future state of Massachusetts. After describing a "pestilent fever" that had swept through the colony and neighboring Indians, the report stated:
It is to be observed that, the spring before this sickness, there was a numerous company of Flies which were like for bigness unto wasps or Bumble-Bees; they came out of little holes in the ground, and did eat up the green things, and made such a constant yelling noise as made the woods ring of them, and ready to deafen the hearers; they were not any seen or heard by the English in this country before this time; but the Indians told them that sickness would follow, and so it did, very hot, in the months of June, July, and August of that summer. (Elaborating on an observation that Marlatt reported in 1907, Gene Kritsky has suggested that Bradford's report is misdated, as Broods XI and XIV would have emerged in Plymouth in 1631 and 1634, respectively, while no presently known brood would have emerged there in 1633.)

Historical accounts cite reports of 15- to 17-year recurrences of enormous numbers of noisy emergent cicadas ("locusts") written as early as 1733. John Bartram, a noted Philadelphia botanist and horticulturist, was among the early writers that described the insect's life cycle, appearance and characteristics.

On May 9, 1715, the Rev. Andreas Sandel, the pastor of Philadelphia's "Gloria Dei" Swedish Lutheran Church, described in his journal an emergence of Brood X. Pehr Kalm, a Finnish naturalist visiting Pennsylvania and New Jersey in 1749 on behalf of the Royal Swedish Academy of Sciences, observed in late May another emergence of that brood. When reporting the event in a paper that a Swedish academic journal published in 1756, Kalm wrote: 

Kalm then described Rev. Sandel's report and one that he had obtained from Benjamin Franklin that had recorded in Philadelphia the emergence from the ground of large numbers of cicadas during early May 1732. He noted that the people who had prepared these documents had made no such reports in other years.

Kalm further noted that others had informed him that they had seen cicadas only occasionally before the insects emerged from the ground in Pennsylvania in large swarms on May 22, 1749. He additionally stated that he had not heard any cicadas in Pennsylvania and New Jersey in 1750 in the same months and areas in which he had heard many in 1749. The 1715 and 1732 reports, when coupled with his own 1749 and 1750 observations, supported the previous "general opinion" that he had cited.

Kalm summarized his findings in a book translated into English and published in London in 1771, stating:

Based on Kalm's account and a specimen that Kalm had provided, in 1758 Carl Linnaeus named the insect Cicada septendecim in the tenth edition of his Systema Naturae.

Moses Bartram, a son of John Bartram, described the next appearance of the brood (Brood X) that Kalm had observed in 1749 in an article entitled Observations on the cicada, or locust of America, which appears periodically once in 16 or 17 years that he wrote in 1766. Bartram's article, which a London journal published in 1768, noted that upon hatching from eggs deposited in the twigs of trees, the young insects ran down to the earth and "entered the first opening that they could find".

In 1775, Thomas Jefferson recorded in his "Garden Book" Brood II's 17-year periodicity, writing that an acquaintance remembered "great locust years" in 1724 and 1741, that he and others recalled another such year in 1758 and that the insects had again emerged from the ground at Monticello in 1775. He noted that the females lay their eggs in the small twigs of trees while above ground.

In April 1800, Benjamin Banneker, who lived near Ellicott's Mills, Maryland, wrote in his record book that he recalled a "great locust year" in 1749, a second in 1766 during which the insects appeared to be "full as numerous as the first", and a third in 1783. He predicted that the insects (Brood X) "may be expected again in they year 1800 which is Seventeen Since their third appearance to me". Describing an effect that the pathogenic fungus, Massospora cicadina, has on its host, Banneker's record book stated that the insects:.... begin to Sing or make a noise from first they come out of the Earth till they die. The hindermost part rots off, and it does not appear to be any pain to them, for they still continue on Singing till they die.

In 1845, Dr. D.L. Pharas of Woodville, Mississippi, announced the 13-year periodicity of the southern cicada broods in a local newspaper, the Woodville Republican. In 1858, Pharas placed the title Cicada tredecim in a subsequent article that the newspaper published on the subject. Ten years later, the American Entomologist published in December 1868 a paper that Benjamin Dann Walsh and Charles Valentine Riley had written that also reported the 13-year periodicity of the southern cicada broods. 

Walsh's and Riley's paper, which Scientific American reprinted in January 1869, illustrated the interior and exterior characteristics of the nymphs' emergence holes and raised turrets. Their article, which did not cite Pharas' reports, was the first to describe the southern cicadas' 13-year periodicity that received widespread attention. Riley later acknowledged Pharas' work in an 1885 publication on periodical cicadas that he authored.

In 1998, an emergence contained a brood of 17-year cicadas (Brood IV) in western Missouri and a brood of 13-year cicadas (Brood XIX) over much of the rest of the state. Each of the broods are the state's largest of their types. As the territories of the two broods overlap (converge) in some areas, the convergence was the state's first since 1777.

Use as human food
Magicicada species are edible when cooked for people who lack allergies to similar foods. A number of recipes are available for this purpose. Some recommend collecting the insects shortly after molting while still soft. Others exhibit preferences for emergent nymphs or hardened adults.

The insects have historically been eaten by Native Americans, who roasted them in hot ovens, stirring them until they were well browned. Marlatt wrote in 1907:

Notes

References

Further reading

External links

Cicada Mania

GIGAmacro has a zoomable, very high-resolution image of the male, female & nymph cicada
InsectSingers.com Recordings of species-specific songs of many North American cicada species.
Liebhold, A.M.; Bohne, M.J.; Lilja, R.L. "Active Periodical Cicada Broods of the United States" (map). USDA Forest Service Northern Research Station, Northeastern Area State and Private Forestry. 2013.
Magicicada.org Brood mapping project General periodical cicada information. Also solicits records and observations from the general public

Massachusetts Cicadas describes behavior, sightings, photos, "how to find" guide, videos and distribution maps of New England and U.S. periodical and annual cicada species including Brood X, Brood XIII, Brood XIV and Brood XIX

Cicadas
Edible insects
Lamotialnini
Native American cuisine
Periodic phenomena
Antipredator adaptations